NBIA may refer to:

 Niels Bohr International Academy, a Center for Theoretical Physics at the Niels Bohr Institute, Copenhagen
 Neurodegeneration with brain iron accumulation, a group of degenerative diseases of the brain
 
 (New) Bangkok International Airport (Suvarnabhumi Airport), an international airport serving Bangkok, Thailand
 National Biomedical Imaging Archive, a National Cancer Institute repository of medical images for researchers and imaging tool developers
 Normandy Beach Improvement Association
 North Bali International Airport